FC Rot-Weiß Koblenz, known as TuS Rot-Weiß Koblenz until 2021, is a German association football club from the city of Koblenz, Rhineland-Palatinate. The club's greatest success has been promotion to the tier four Regionalliga Südwest in 2018–19.

The club should not be confused with the better-known TuS Koblenz which has, from 2006 to 2010, played in the 2. Bundesliga and is also based in Koblenz.

History
The club was founded on 14 June 1947 in a merger of local clubs KTSC 1860, T.G. and VfL 06/07. Initially it was named Sportfreunde Rot-Weiß Koblenz, being prohibited by the French occupation authorities to carry the title Turnen (English: Gymnastics) in its name or have a gymnastics department. In 1951, after this ban had been lifted, the club adopted the name, TuS Rot-Weiß Koblenz.

Throughout its history the club has been playing in local amateur leagues until a league championship in the tier seven Bezirksliga Mitte in 2010–11 took it up to the highest league of the Rhineland Football Association, the Rheinlandliga. After finishing in the top four in its first three seasons Koblenz came only tenth in 2014–15 but won the league the following season, 2015–16.

Through this title the club earned promotion to the tier five Oberliga Rheinland-Pfalz/Saar, where it played from 2016 to 2017. In 2019 Rot-Weiß won promotion to the fourth tier Regionalliga Südwest. By the time the season was abandoned because of the COVID-19 pandemic in Germany, they had only earned 5 points in 22 games without a single win, finishing in last place. Because it was decided that there would be no relegation that season, they will play in the same league again in the 2020–21 season.

On 1 July 2021, the football department was split off from the rest of the sports club and was renamed to FC Rot-Weiß Koblenz.

Current squad

Honours
The club's honours:
 Rheinlandliga
 Champions: 2015–16
 Bezirksliga Mitte
 Champions: 2010–11
 Rhineland Cup
 Champions: 2018, 2021

Recent seasons
The recent season-by-season performance of the club:

 With the introduction of the 3. Liga in 2008 as the new third tier, below the 2. Bundesliga, all leagues below dropped one tier.

Key

References

External links
Official club site 
Official site of the football department 
TuS Rot-Weiss Koblenz at fupa.net 

Football clubs in Germany
Football clubs in Rhineland-Palatinate
Association football clubs established in 1947
1947 establishments in Germany
Sport in Koblenz